Sycophila is a genus of wasp that associates with figs and galls of various insects such as gall wasps and gall midges. They have a cosmopolitan distribution.

Species
There are currently around 120 described species

References

External links

Eurytomidae